Willowbrook is a special service area in the Rural Municipality of Orkney No. 244, Saskatchewan, Canada that was incorporated as a village prior to July 31, 2008. The community is located 30 km north of the City of Melville at the intersection of Highway 47 and Highway 52.

Demographics 

See also 
List of communities in Saskatchewan
List of hamlets in Saskatchewan

References 

Special service areas in Saskatchewan
Designated places in Saskatchewan
Former villages in Saskatchewan
Orkney No. 244, Saskatchewan
Populated places disestablished in 2008
Division No. 9, Saskatchewan